The 2019–20 Spartan South Midlands Football League season was the 23rd in the history of Spartan South Midlands Football League, a football competition in England.

The allocations for Steps 1 to 6 for season 2019–20 were announced by the FA on 19 May. These were subject to appeal, and the Spartan South Midlands' constitution was ratified at the league's AGM on 22 June.

As a result of the COVID-19 pandemic, the season was formally cancelled on 26 March 2020, with all results from the being expunged, and no promotion or relegation taking place to, from, or within the competition. On 30 March 2020, sixty-six non-league clubs sent an open letter to the Football Association requesting that they reconsider their decision.

Premier Division

At the end of the season 2018–19, five teams left the Premier Division:
 Biggleswade, promoted to Southern League Division One Central
 Cockfosters, transferred to the Essex Senior League
 Hadley, transferred to the Essex Senior League
 London Tigers, relegated to Division One
 Stotfold, relegated to Division One

The remaining 15 teams, together with the following, will form the Premier Division for 2019–20:
 Aylesbury Vale Dynamos, relegated from Southern League Division One Central, with a name change from Aylesbury
 Broadfields United, promoted from Division One
 Dunstable Town, relegated from Southern League Division One Central
 Eynesbury Rovers, transferred from the United Counties League
 Harefield United, promoted from Division One
 Newport Pagnell Town, transferred from the United Counties League

Premier Division table

Results

Division One

At the end of the season 2018–19, five teams left Division One:
 Broadfields United, promoted to the Premier Division
 Codicote, relegated to Step 7
 Harefield United, promoted to the Premier Division
 Hatfield Town, relegated to Step 7
 Risborough Rangers, transferred to Hellenic League Division One East

The remaining 15 teams, together with the following, will form Division One for 2019–20:
 London Tigers, relegated from the Premier Division
 New Salamis, promoted from the Hertfordshire Senior County League
 Shefford Town & Campton, promoted from the Bedfordshire County League
 St Panteleimon, promoted from the Middlesex County League
 Stotfold, relegated from the Premier Division

Division One table

Results

Division Two

Division Two featured 12 clubs which competed in the division last season, along with three new clubs:
Codicote, relegated from Division One
Tring Corinthians, re-appeared in Division Two
Buckingham United

Division Two table

References

2019-20
9
Association football events curtailed and voided due to the COVID-19 pandemic